The Mercedes-Benz GLS (X167) is the third generation of the Mercedes-Benz GLS full-sized luxury SUV that began production in October 2019. It replaces the Mercedes-Benz GL-Class/GLS (X166). The new X167 is developed to be "the S-Class of SUVs" in mind, offering the luxurious equipment.

Development and launch 
The third generation X167 GLS debuted at the 2019 New York International Auto Show. It is launched in October 2019 in the United States and at the end of 2019 for Europe and rest of the world. The X167 is 7.7 cm longer and 2.2 cm wider than X166 for greater driving and riding comfort. The wheelbase is 6 cm longer, which improves the body proportion and interior space for the second row seats. Additionally, X167 GLS is first SUV from Mercedes-Benz to have fully electrically adjustable three rows of seats and to offer the optional six-seat configuration with captain seats for second row. The second and third row seats can be folded electrically flat with a touch of a button.

Equipment 
The MULTIBEAM LED headlamp system with total of 112 LED bulbs per headlamp are fitted as standard along with daytime running lights containing three LED segments. (Note the 'adaptive headlights' feature feature is disabled in US-spec vehicles due to legacy Federal regulations.) The optional extra-charge Rear Seat Comfort Package Plus has Android tablet fitted to the second row centre armrest: the tablet allows the second row passengers to access MBUX comfort and entertainment functions as well as five-level climate control. The controls can be overridden by the driver if wished.

The new instrument cluster has two large 31.2 cm screens side by side for displaying and accessing the latest generation of MBUX (Mercedes-Benz User Experience) to control many functions by touchscreen, trackpad, switches and buttons on steering wheel, or by hand gestures.

The extra-charge options for reducing the driving fatigue, especially over the long distance, are Acoustical-Comfort Package that acoustically cancels the noise within the interior and Energizing Package and Energizing Package Plus that use artificial intelligence to manage the maximal driving comfort and attention.

The suspension system uses the Airmatic air suspension system carried over from X166. For greater driving comfort, the optional E-Active Body Control suspension can counteract body roll, pitching, and squat by controlling individually spring and damping forces individually at each wheel. E-Active Body Control uses a camera mounted on the top of the windscreen to scan the road's surface and gradient to determine whether to slacken off the suspension or stiffen it.

Models

Mercedes-Maybach GLS 600 4MATIC

A first Maybach version of the GLS, the GLS 600 4MATIC, was unveiled at 2019 Guangzhou International Motor Show on 21 November 2019. The engine is a detuned version of the M177 V8 Biturbo found in the Mercedes-AMG GLS 63 4MATIC+, but with a 48-Volt mild hybrid system. Although Mercedes-Benz has registered both GLS 600 4MATIC and GLS 680 4MATIC nomenclatures, the latter was designated exclusively to the Chinese market due to the auspicious nature of number 8, closely associated with luck and wealth, as the manufacturer has done with Mercedes-Maybach S 680 (known as the S 650 in other markets). The GLS 600 4MATIC isn't based on the Mercedes-Maybach Vision Ultimate Luxury concept vehicle shown at 2018 Shanghai Motor Show. This version is the first time that a three-point star stand-up ornament affixed to the hood/bonnet on a SUV rather than the large "jet-engine" three-point star filling up the grill space as found in every SUV from Mercedes-Benz since 1979.

Mercedes-AMG GLS 63 4MATIC+

The second generation AMG version of the GLS-Class, GLS 63 4MATIC+, was introduced at the same time as Mercedes-Maybach GLS 600 4MATIC. The novel feature is the "reintroduction" of classical AMG monoblock alloy wheels, which were popular option in the 1980s and 1990s.

Due to its large size and poor environmental record, Environmental Action Germany nominated the car for their Goldener Geier (Golden Vulture) 2020 award.

Engines (2019–present)

Transmission (2019–present)

References

External links 
 

GLS-Class (X167)
Cars introduced in 2019
Luxury sport utility vehicles
All-wheel-drive vehicles
2020s cars